The Man From Blackhawk is a Western television series about an insurance investigator starring Robert Rockwell that aired on ABC from October 9, 1959 until September 23, 1960. It was also shown in Canada on CBC Television.

Premise

In The Man from Blackhawk, (set in the 1870s), Rockwell plays Sam Logan, an insurance investigator from the Blackhawk Insurance Company, which has headquarters in Chicago. Logan scours the West investigating claims, verifying their accuracy, and seeking to root out fraud and dishonesty. He is also more inclined to use his fists than a gun.

Much of Logan's work is done in disguise, and he has outfits for 34 professions, including cotton speculator, cowhand, gentleman of leisure, professional gambler, and stage driver.

Rockwell, who won the Logan role over 135 competing actors, said of his character: "He has strong principles, amazing integrity and is completely self sufficient. He's not particularly pleasant but he's always needling, always digging for evil."

Characters and actors 
Beverly Garland is cast as Sarah Marshall, with Richard Rust as George Blackburn, in "Logan's Policy", the series premiere (October 9, 1959). Ruta Lee portrays Ginnie Thompson, a young woman due to collect her murdered father's life insurance policy, in "The Legacy" (December 25, 1959). Chubby Johnson portrayed Jessie Turnbull in the episode titled "The Last Days of Jessie Turnbull." Not all episodes are set in the American West. Tommy Rettig and Amanda Randolph, for instance, are cast as Pierre and Auntie Cotton, respectively, in "The Ghost of Lafitte" (1960), set in New Orleans, Louisiana, with Robert Foulk as Hoag Lafitte. Gregg Palmer and Walter Burke are cast as Gil Harrison and Tom Abbott, respectively, in "The Harpoon Story" (1960), set in coastal New England.  Nita Talbot appears in the episode "In His Steps" (1960), set in the Bowery district of New York City. Child actor Robert Eyer portrays Davey in "The Montreal Story" (1960).

Other guest stars include:

John Anderson
Joanna Barnes
Robert Bray
Virginia Christine
Andy Clyde
Walter Coy
Brad Dexter
Virginia Gregg
Alan Hale, Jr.

Chubby Johnson
Bethel Leslie
Mort Mills
Denver Pyle
Harry Dean Stanton
Robert J. Stevenson
Karl Swenson
Jean Willes

Production 
The Man from Blackhawk was a Screen Gems production. The series was created by Frank Barron and produced by Herb Meadow. Meadow left after 13 weeks to return to writing. Although he had been under contract for 26 episodes, he cited the demands of 18-hour work days that exhausted him mentally and left no time for his family or other activities.

The show was broadcast from 8:30 to 9 p.m. Eastern Time on Fridays. Competition in its time slot included Hotel de Paree on CBS and Wichita Town on NBC.

Producers spent more than two years looking through insurance company records, old newspapers, and other documents to find material about 1870s-era insurance business operations and how swindles and frauds were committed.

Episodes

References

 McNeil, Alex. Total Television  (1996). New York: Penguin Books

External links
 

1959 American television series debuts
1960 American television series endings
American Broadcasting Company original programming
Black-and-white American television shows
English-language television shows
Television series by Sony Pictures Television
1950s Western (genre) television series
1960s Western (genre) television series
Television series by Screen Gems